Brown Paper Bag may refer to:

 Brown paper bag, a paper bag of brown color
 Brown Paper Bag (film), won a 2003 BAFTA Award for Best Short Film
 "Brown Paper Bag", a song by Birdman and Lil Wayne from Like Father, Like Son, 2006
 "Brown Paper Bag", a song by DJ Khaled from We the Best, 2007 
 "Brown Paper Bag", a song by Migos from Culture, 2017
 "Brown Paper Bag", a song by Roni Size from New Forms, 1997
 "Brown Paper Bag", a song by the Syndicate of Sound, 1970
 Brown Paperbag, a slice of life webcomic by cartoonist Sailesh Gopalan
 Brown Paper Bag Test, a term in African-American oral history

See also
 Paper bag (disambiguation)